Einar Ólafsson (born 13 January 1928) is an Icelandic former basketball player and coach. He was one of the main pioneers of modern basketball in Iceland and was one of the inaugural members of Íþróttafélag Reykjavíkur's basketball department. He played for ÍR in the 1950's before turning to coaching. He coached both ÍR men's and women's teams, winning several national championships.

References

1928 births
Living people
Einar Ólafsson
Einar Ólafsson
Einar Ólafsson
Einar Ólafsson
Einar Ólafsson
Einar Ólafsson
Einar Ólafsson
Einar Ólafsson